Horseless carriage is an early name for the motor car or automobile. Prior to the invention of the motor car, carriages were usually pulled by animals, typically horses. The term can be compared to other transitional terms, such as wireless phone. These are cases in which a new technology is compared to an older one by describing what the new one does not have.

Most horseless carriages are notable for their similarity to existing horse-drawn carriages, but with some type of mechanical propulsion. Features of the first horseless carriages include tiller steering, an engine under the floorboards, and a high center of gravity.In the 19th century, steam engines became the primary source of power for railway locomotives and ships, and for powering processes in fixed installations such as factories. In 1803, what is said to have been the first horseless carriage was a steam-driven vehicle demonstrated in London, England, by Richard Trevithick. In the 1820s, Goldsworthy Gurney built steam-powered road vehicles. One has survived to be on display at Glasgow Museum of Transport. In the United States, a four-wheel steam carriage was made by Sylvester H. Roper in 1863.

The 1896 Armstrong horseless carriage is notable as an early hybrid vehicle, which combined an electric motor with battery and gasoline-fueled internal-combustion engine.

In 1893, Frank Duryea is reported to have made the first horseless carriage trip on U.S. roads, in Springfield, Massachusetts, traveling approximately  before engine problems forced him to stop and make repairs. He went on to found the first U.S. car company, the Duryea Motor Wagon Company, with his brother.

In April 2016, horseless carriages from the turn of 19th and the early 20th centuries were featured in a re-creation of the first London Motor Show in 1896.

See also
History of steam road vehicles
Horse and buggy
Wagon
Car
Steam car
Electric car
Motorcycle
Quadricycle
Brass Era car
Stagecoach
Specific models:
Benz Patent-Motorwagen
Duryea Motor Wagon
Daimler Motorized Carriage

References

History of the automobile
19th century in transport